Abacetus vaccaroi is a species of ground beetle in the subfamily Pterostichinae. It was described by Straneo in 1940.

References

vaccaroi
Beetles described in 1940